The Government of Madhya Pradesh. also known as the State Government of Madhya Pradesh, or locally as the State Government, is the supreme governing authority of the Indian state of Madhya Pradesh and its 52 districts. It consists of an executive, led by the governor of Madhya Pradesh, a judiciary and a legislative branch. In 2000, the southern portion was broken off to form the new state of Chhattisgarh with its own government.

Executive
Like other states in India, the head of state of Madhya Pradesh is the governor, appointed by the president of India on the advice of the Central government. The governor's post is largely ceremonial. The chief minister is the head of government and is vested with most of the executive powers and financial powers. Bhopal is the capital of Madhya Pradesh, and houses the Madhya Pradesh Vidhan Sabha (Legislative Assembly) and the secretariat.

Legislative
The present legislature of Madhya Pradesh is unicameral. The legislative house, Madhya Pradesh Vidhan Sabha consists 230 Members of Legislative Assembly (MLA) elected directly from single-seat constituencies and one nominated member. Its term is 5 years, unless sooner dissolved.

On 1 February 2016 the Madhya Pradesh legislative assembly banned the use of English for government purposes, effectively Hindi will be used for all official purposes, and issued instructions to officials not to harass employees who do not know English.
On 4 December 2017, Madhya Pradesh Assembly unanimously passed a Bill awarding death to those found guilty of raping girls aged 12 and below.

Judicial
The Madhya Pradesh High Court, located in Jabalpur, has jurisdiction over the whole state. The chief justice is Ravi Malimath.

Government agencies
Department of Public Relations

References

External links